Gurdaspur Lok Sabha constituency is one of the 13 Lok Sabha (parliamentary) constituencies in Punjab state in northern India. The incumbent MP is Sunny Deol from Bharatiya Janata Party.

Assembly segments

Presently, Gurdaspur Lok Sabha constituency consist of nine assembly constituencies

Members of Parliament

Election results

2019

2017

2014

2009

See also
 Gurdaspur district
 List of Constituencies of the Lok Sabha

Notes

External links
Gurdaspur lok sabha constituency election 2019 result details

Lok Sabha constituencies in Punjab, India
Gurdaspur district